Crown Candy Kitchen is a restaurant, ice cream fountain, and candy store located on St. Louis Avenue in the Old North St. Louis neighborhood of St. Louis, Missouri.

This St. Louis landmark is the oldest operating soda fountain in the metropolitan area, and one of the oldest in the country. The restaurant has an old-fashioned decor with Coca-Cola memorabilia from the 1930s, an antique cash register, and four-person booths. It offers a simple menu with sandwiches, “Chili, Tamales and Other Hot Stuff” and is known for its desserts, especially for its handmade malts and milkshakes. It is a popular lunch destination for office workers in downtown St. Louis. The chocolate is made from decades-old molds, some imported from Holland and Germany.

History 
The restaurant was founded in 1913 by two Macedonian immigrants. It was first operated by Harry Karandzieff and his friend Pete Jugaloff, then his son George, and later George's three sons, Andy, Tommy, and Mike Karandzieff.

Harry Karandzieff and his friend Pete Jugaloff opened Crown Candy in 1913.

Crown Candy has been making ice cream since 1925.

A fire caused by a space heater damaged the restaurant on December 25, 1983. Some Coca-Cola memorabilia and $2,000 of candy was destroyed.

Business was slowest in the 1970s and it picked up in the 1990s.

Crown Candy switched from Coca-Cola to Pepsi in 1999.

George Karandzieff died in hospice on Easter Sunday of 2005 after his sons finished up their work at Crown Candy, with Easter being their busiest times in the year.

Famous treats 
The "Heart-Stopping BLT" is a classic from Crown Candy that uses 14 pieces of crispy, kettle-cooked bacon. This famous treat started off as an offering from Harry Karandzieff to Adam Richman after his failed attempt at the infamous Five Malt Challenge. In 2012, Richman then featured the sandwich on Best Sandwich in America. According to Andy Karandzieff, the BLT first started fairly normal before employees eventually started adding more and more bacon. Crown Candy Kitchen makes their chocolate candy by hand to this day.

Crown Candy challenge 
The restaurant offers a challenge to consumers of their trademark malts. Should a person drink five 24-ounce (710 mL) malts or shakes within 30 minutes, they receive the malts for free and have their name inscribed upon a plaque in the store. During this challenge you will be disqualified if you: throw up during the 30 minutes of the challenge, go to the bathroom or leave your seat at any time during the challenge, or if anyone helps you but drinking any portion of the malt. The record for the five-malt challenge is 2 minutes, 29 seconds by Randy Santel. For seven malts, the record is six minutes, by Ben Monson. Since 1913, only about 55 people have successfully completed the Crown Candy Challenge, while several attempt it each week.

In popular culture 
The Crown Candy challenge was attempted on the Travel Channel's television series, Man v. Food, by the show's host, Adam Richman, on an episode that aired on 25 February 2009.  Richman was only able to finish about four of the five malts.

In 2012, it was featured on another Adam Richman-hosted show, Best Sandwich in America, for the "Heart-Stopping BLT" sandwich.

References

Further reading

External links 
Crown Candy Kitchen official website
Interview with owner on Meet St. Louis Podcast
Review from Fodors

Macedonian American history
Restaurants in St. Louis
Restaurants established in 1913
1913 establishments in Missouri